Melvin "Fritz" Hanson (July 13, 1914 – February 14, 1996) was a Canadian football player for the Winnipeg Blue Bombers and the Calgary Stampeders.  Hanson was signed by the Blue Bombers for $125 a game and free room and board, which was a considerable sum in the cash-strapped dirty thirties.  Nicknamed the "Galloping Ghost", "Twinkle Toes" and the "Perham Flash", Hanson was one of the pioneers of football in Western Canada and a huge star at the time.  Although he weighed only  he used his incredible quickness to evade defenders.  He helped lead the Blue Bombers to the first Grey Cup victory by a western Canadian team in 1935 and won again with the Bombers in 1939 and 1941.  In the 1935 Grey Cup Game Hanson had an incredible 334 punt return yards on 13 returns, a record that still stands today, including a sensational 78-yard return for the winning touchdown.  He played with Winnipeg from 1935 through 1946 then spent two years playing for the Calgary Stampeders, where he won a fourth Grey Cup in 1948.

Hanson was elected into the Canadian Football Hall of Fame in 1963 and inducted into the Manitoba Sports Hall of Fame in 1980. He became a Canadian citizen in 1966 and, in 2005, Hanson was named one of the Blue Bombers 20 All-Time Greats. He died in Calgary on February 14, 1996, at the age of 81.

Hanson and his wife, Maxine, had four daughters.

References

External links
 Profile at Manitoba Sports Hall of Fame
 Fritz Hanson's profile at the Canadian Football Hall of Fame
 The Canadian Encyclopedia

1914 births
1996 deaths
American players of Canadian football
American emigrants to Canada
Canadian football return specialists
Calgary Stampeders players
North Dakota State Bison football players
Winnipeg Blue Bombers players
Canadian Football Hall of Fame inductees
People from Perham, Minnesota
Players of American football from Minnesota